Carlos Guerrero (born 1891, date of death unknown) was a Mexican sports shooter. He competed in the 50 m rifle, prone event at the 1932 Summer Olympics.

References

External links
 

1891 births
Year of death missing
Mexican male sport shooters
Olympic shooters of Mexico
Shooters at the 1932 Summer Olympics
Sportspeople from Guanajuato